João Paulo Cassandra (born 1961) is a São Toméan politician. He was President of the Regional Government of Príncipe from 20 June 2006 to 5 October 2006. Cassandra is a member of the Movement for the Liberation of São Tomé and Príncipe-Social Democratic Party (MLSTP-PSD)

References

Living people
Movement for the Liberation of São Tomé and Príncipe/Social Democratic Party politicians
1961 births
People from Príncipe
21st-century São Tomé and Príncipe politicians